James M. Van Cleve was an American football player and coach.  He was the fourth ever known person to be paid to play the sport. Only Pudge Heffelfinger, Sport Donnelly and Peter Wright were professionals before him. Van Cleve's contract was with the Allegheny Athletic Association for $50 per game for the entire 1893 season.

In 1894, during a game against the Pittsburgh Athletic Club. Allegheny's quarterback, A. S. Valentine, was thrown out of the game after coming to the aid of Van Cleve during a fight against Pittsburgh's Joe Trees. After several appeals, Valentine left the field reportedly "crying like a baby" by the local media. During the 1895 season, Allegheny did not field a team after learning the club was under investigation by the Amateur Athletic Union for secretly paying its players. As a result, Van Cleve played for the upstart Duquesne Country and Athletic Club. He would return to Allegeheny for their last season in 1896.

College career
Prior to his professional career, Van Cleve played college football at Lehigh University. On October 15, 1892, Van Cleve scored Lehigh's only touchdown in a loss against the Orange Athletic Club. He would play for Lehigh five days later during a 50–0 loss to the Princeton Tigers.

Van Cleve served as the head football coach at Pittsburgh Catholic College of the Holy Ghost—later renamed Duquesne University—in 1898.

Head coaching record

References

Year of birth missing
Year of death missing
19th-century players of American football
American football ends
American football halfbacks
Allegheny Athletic Association players
Duquesne Country and Athletic Club players
Duquesne Dukes football coaches
Lehigh Mountain Hawks football players
Coaches of American football from Pennsylvania
Players of American football from Pennsylvania